Margarinotus ephemeralis is a species of clown beetle in the family Histeridae. It is currently only known from southern California.

Description
The elytra have five ; the first three are complete, the fourth is complete or slightly abbreviated, and the fifth is present in apical half or less, and may be nearly absent. The prothorax has convergent,  sides; the pronotum has a single lateral stria. Margarinotus ephemeralis is very similar to Margarinotus remotus, but differ in the pronotal punctuation.

Ecology
Some specimens were collected from the burrow entrances of California ground squirrel, and others from temporary pools where they presumably had been flooded out of burrows. This species might be an obligate inquiline of California ground squirrel burrows.

References

Further reading

 

Histeridae
Beetles of North America
Endemic fauna of California
Beetles described in 2010
Articles created by Qbugbot
Fauna without expected TNC conservation status